The 2007–08 Cupa României was the 70th season of the annual Romanian football knockout tournament. The final was held on May 10, 2008 at the Stadionul Ceahlăul in Piatra Neamţ.

Round of 32
The matches were played on 25, 26 and 27 September 2007.

|}

Round of 16
The matches were played on 5 and 6 December 2007.

|}

Quarter-finals

Semi-finals

Final

References
 Romanian Cup 2007/2008 (RomanianSoccer)

Cupa Romaniei, 2007-08
Cupa Romaniei, 2007-08
Cupa României seasons